Philippe Wahl is a French business executive. Having previously been a government advisor and bank executive, in September 2013 he was appointed president and chief executive officer of La Poste, the group which includes the French postal service.

Early life and education 
Wahl's parents are Adrien Wahl, a human resources director, and Georgette Meyer, a teacher. He graduated from the Paris Institute of Political Studies in 1978 and has a Master of Advanced Studies degree in economics from Pantheon-Sorbonne University. In 1982–84 he earned a degree from the École nationale d'administration.

Career 
Wahl began his career in government in 1984 at the Council of State as an auditor and Master of Requests; in 1986 he also became an advisor to the president of the Commission des opérations de bourse, the French stock market regulator. In 1989, he became cabinet director to Tony Dreyfus when Dreyfus was Secretary of State under Michel Rocard, then became Rocard's technical advisor on economic, financial and fiscal matters. Under Rocard he was able to achieve the passage of the Contribution sociale généralisée, a social benefits tax, despite the opposition of the then Minister of Finance, Pierre Bérégovoy.

In private business, he worked for Compagnie bancaire beginning in 1991, as advisor to the CEO, from 1992 as a member of the board, and from 1994 as assistant CEO, and in 1997 became director of the specialist financial services arm and a member of the executive committee at Banque Paribas, with which Compagnie bancaire merged. In 1999 he became CEO of the French directorate of savings banks, CNCE (now Groupe BPCE). This position carried with it the presidency of the holding group Sopassure and of the board of the insurer Écureuil assurances IARD and membership of the governing board of CDC Ixis and CNP Assurances. In 2005 he became CEO of Havas and in 2006 vice president of Bolloré. In January 2007 he returned to banking at The Royal Bank of Scotland Group, initially as CEO for France, in March 2008 becoming advisor to the RBS Global Banking and Markets Board and in December 2008, CEO for France, Belgium and Luxembourg.

In January 2011, Wahl was appointed chairman of the board of the Banque postale division of La Poste and adjunct CEO of the La Poste group. On 25 September 2013, the President of France appointed him president and chief executive of La Poste, succeeding Jean-Paul Bailly. He has promised to pursue three goals: economic health, good working conditions, and above all customer satisfaction, which he has developed in his 2014 strategic plan, La Poste 2020.

He implements a diversification strategy for La Poste's activities, developing amongst others : home-care services for seniors, sessions of driving licence written exam. In 2016, he signed a contract to take majority stakes in Axeo, a large network of local branches specialized in neighbourhood services. He also expands Geopost activities in Italy, Russia, Brazil and Vietnam.

Other activities
 La France s’engage Foundation, Member of the Board
 Institut Montaigne, Member of the Board of Directors

Personal life 
Wahl is married to Sylvie Schwob, a human resources executive at Sanofi whom he met at university, and has three children.

References

External links
 Philippe Wahl's cv

1956 births
Living people
Sciences Po alumni
University of Paris alumni
École nationale d'administration alumni
French bankers
French financiers
NatWest Group people